Coryphella pallida is a species of sea slug, an aeolid nudibranch, a marine heterobranch mollusc in the family Coryphellidae

Description
C. pallida has a maximum length of 10mm.

Distribution
This species is distributed in the western Pacific Ocean, primarily in Bermuda.

References

Coryphellidae
Gastropods described in 1900